Robe, also called as  Bale Robe, is a town in south-central Oromia Region, Ethiopia.

It is located about 430 kilometres by road from the capital Addis Ababa.

Robe shares Robe Airport (ICAO code HAGB, IATA GOB) with neighboring Goba. Ethiopian Airlines has a scheduled flight four times a week connecting it to the capital Addis Ababa and to the southern city Arba Minch.

The main market day is Thursday, with a smaller market working on Tuesdays and Sundays at another place in the town. Notable tourist attractions include the Sof Omar Caves, which lie to the east.

Climate

Demographics 
The 2007 national census reported a total population for Robe of 44,382, of whom 22,543 were men and 21,839 were women. The plurality of inhabitants said they were Muslim, with 48.08% of the population reporting they observed this belief, while 45.02% of the population practised Ethiopian Orthodox Christianity and 6.13% were Protestant.

The 1994 national census reported this town had a total population of 21,516 of whom 10,462 were males and 11,054 were females.

Education 
Records at the Nordic Africa Institute website provide details of a primary school in Robe in 1968.
List of Primary schools in Robe Town: Ali Birra Primary School, Madda Walabu Primary School, Kibxate Primary School, Robe Gelema Primary School, Zeybela Primary School, and General Umar Suleyman Primary School 
Numbers of secondary Schools in Bale Robe Town=5;
Robe Secondary School, Robe Gelema Secondary School, Madda Walabu Secondary School, General Wako Gutu Secondary School, and General Umar Suleyman Secondary School
and has one preparatory school which is called Robe preparatory School.

As of 2013, there are schools for secondary education in Bale Robe.
There is also a teachers-training college, and university here called Madawalabu University.

Transportation 
The main mode of transport within the town is called a Bajaj.

Notes 

Populated places in the Oromia Region
Ethiopia
Cities and towns in Ethiopia